House at Upper Laurel Iron Works is a historic home located in Newlin Township, Chester County, Pennsylvania. It was built about 1872, and is a two-story, stone banked dwelling with a gable roof.

It was added to the National Register of Historic Places in 1985.

References

Houses on the National Register of Historic Places in Pennsylvania
Houses completed in 1872
Houses in Chester County, Pennsylvania
National Register of Historic Places in Chester County, Pennsylvania